Albert Richter (6 May 1909 – 2 August 2007) was a German academic and expert in silviculture or forest management. He is notable for founding the Choriner Musiksommer music festival, developing a new planning-process for forest management for the German Democratic Republic in the 1950s, and writing several works on the history of forest management, including a biography of Heinrich Cotta. He also served as a professor and director of the Forestry College in Eberswalde.

Richter was born in Lossnitz in Freiberg, Saxony in 1909 and died, aged 98, at Eberswalde in Brandenburg in 2007.

External links
Books by and about Albert Richter in the Deutschen Nationalbibliothek
https://web.archive.org/web/20070927202539/http://www.moz.de/index.php/Moz/Article/category/Eberswalde/id/196766

↘

Scientists from Saxony
1909 births
2007 deaths
German earth scientists
Academic staff of the Eberswalde University for Sustainable Development
German foresters